Young Communist League of Greece (OKNE) was the youth wing of the Communist Party of Greece. OKNE was founded on November 28, 1922. The journal I Neolaia (Η ΝΕΟΛΑΙΑ) became the official organ of OKNE. OKNE was a section of the Communist Youth International. Nikolaos Zachariadis became the leader of OKNE in 1924. In 1925, OKNE was banned by the Greek authorities, along with the Communist Party itself and all its affiliated organizations.

In 1943 OKNE was replaced by another youth organization, the United Panhellenic Organization of Youth (EPON).

See also
Communist Youth of Greece

References 

Youth wings of political parties in Greece
Youth wings of communist parties
1922 establishments in Greece
Communist Party of Greece
1925 disestablishments